Tengiz Vladimirovich Tarba (born 7 February 1979) is a former Russian football player.

References

1979 births
Russian people of Abkhazian descent
Living people
Russian footballers
FC Kuban Krasnodar players
FC Zhemchuzhina Sochi players
Russian Premier League players

Association football midfielders